Satkhira Day-Night College is a co-educational college in Satkhira. It was founded 29 August 1992. It was applied by Board of Intermediate and Secondary Education, Jessore on 1 July 1994. Degree affiliation on 1 July 1995 by the National University, Dhaka. Mr. Abdul Motilib is the founder of Satkhira Day-Night College and he is the Editor of The Daily Kafela news paper, Satkhira.

References

Universities and colleges in Bangladesh
Educational institutions of Khulna Division